Workplace revenge refers to the general action of purposeful retaliation within the workplace in an attempt to seek silence the victim and avoid accountability.

Retaliation: work related vs. social
Acts of retaliation within an organization can be categorized in two ways: work related retaliation and social retaliation. "Work retaliation victimization involves adverse work-related actions that have the purpose or effect of negatively altering the target’s job and that are intended by the instigator or perceived by the target to be a reprisal for the target’s behavior." This categorization of workplace revenge concerns work-related actions that are often tangible, formal, and documented in employment records. Examples include termination, demotion, poor performance appraisal, and cutting hours. These are actions by which a victim may feel the need to seek justice.

On the other hand, "social retaliation victimization involves antisocial behaviors that have the purpose or effect of negatively altering the target’s interpersonal relations with other organizational members and that are intended by the instigator or perceived by the target to be a reprisal for the target’s behavior." This type of retaliatory action refers to behaviors between members of an organization, both verbal and nonverbal, that often go undocumented. Examples of this type include harassment, insulting, blame, threats, or the "silent treatment." These acts of workplace revenge have the purpose of negatively altering the victim's interpersonal relations with other organizational members as well as potentially affecting work productivity.

Retaliation as a form of justice

In an attempt to seek justice as a response to what is perceived as an unfair act, an employee will often seek justice. The concept of justice has been defined in three categories of justice:
 distributive justice concerns the outcome of allocation, based on equity, equality or need. An example of this is the perceived fairness of distribution of tasks within an organization.
 procedural justice is the way in which individuals perceive the fairness of procedures that result from a decision process within an organization. An example would include ample advance notice of job related changes directly affecting the employee.
 interactional justice is the representation of behaviors associated with fairness of treatment by members within an organization, whether the interaction is between superiors to subordinates or among members of similar status.

Revenge as a coping strategy
The two common responses to one's unjust behavior are forgiveness and revenge. When one perceives he has been the victim of unjust behavior, he will evaluate the situation and select the appropriate coping response for the negative experience. If the victim views the situation with anger and resentment, he chooses revenge as the next necessary step. On the opposite side, if the victim is able to let go of the negative emotions attached to the circumstances, he will choose forgiveness. Individuals are more likely to forgive a transgressor if they avoid holding the transgressor accountable for the offense and if the transgressor is apologetic.

See also
Going postal
 Organizational retaliatory behavior
 Workplace bullying
 Workplace incivility
 Workplace violence

References

 Bradfield, M. & Aquino, K. (1999). The effects of blame attributions and offender likeableness on forgiveness and revenge in the workplace. Journal of Management, 25, 607–628.
 Cortina, L. & Magley, V. (2003). Raising voice, risking retaliation: Events following interpersonal mistreatment in the workplace. Journal of Occupational Health Psychology. 8 (4), 247–265.
 Skarlicki, D. & Folger, R. (1997). Retaliation in the workplace: The roles of distributive, procedural, and interactional justice. Journal of Applied Psychology. 82 (3), 434–443.
 Yoshimura, S. (2007). Goals and emotional outcomes of revenge activities in interpersonal relationships. Journal of Social and Personal Relationships. 24, 87–98.

Occupational safety and health
Workplace
Workplace bullying